Fernando Ruiz Hierro (born 23 March 1968) is a Spanish football manager and former player who played as a centre-back, sweeper or defensive midfielder. He is the current sporting director of Liga MX club C.D. Guadalajara.

He won five La Liga and three Champions League trophies with Real Madrid in 14 years after signing from Valladolid, during which he appeared in 601 official matches. He also competed professionally in Qatar and England.

Hierro represented Spain on 89 occasions, appearing in four World Cups and two European Championships. He started working as a manager in 2016 with Oviedo, being appointed at the helm of the national team two years later.

Club career

Early years and Real Madrid
Hierro was born in Vélez-Málaga, Province of Málaga. After beginning his football career at local club Vélez CF he had a very brief youth spell with neighbouring CD Málaga, where he was told he was not good enough for the sport, which prompted a return home. He eventually made his La Liga debut with Real Valladolid, being bought by Real Madrid in the summer of 1989 after two solid seasons.

At Real, Hierro scored seven goals in 37 games in his first season, and eventually had his position on the field advanced by coach Radomir Antić, continuing his good performances with the addition of goals – in three seasons combined he netted an astonishing 44 league goals, 21 alone in 1991–92, a career-best. During years, he often partnered club great Manolo Sanchís in the centre of the defense, being instrumental in the conquest of five leagues and three UEFA Champions League trophies and being named captain after the latter's retirement.

On 24 March 2002, Hierro scored a hat-trick in a 3–1 home win against Real Zaragoza, although the ultimate leaders would be Valencia CF. He was released at the end of the 2002–03 season alongside club manager Vicente del Bosque, under rather unceremonious circumstances; having appeared in 497 top-division matches over the course of 16 seasons (105 goals), he then chose a lucrative move to the wealthy but developing Middle East football industry, joining Qatar's Al-Rayyan SC.

Bolton Wanderers
After just one year, Hierro returned to Europe to sign with Premier League side Bolton Wanderers on the advice of his English teammate at Real Madrid Steve McManaman, and teaming up with another former player of that club, Iván Campo. He scored once during his tenure, which came in a 3–2 loss at Norwich City in December 2004 and, even though hard-pressed by fans and manager Sam Allardyce to stay for a further campaign, he announced his retirement from professional football on 10 May 2005.

International career
Hierro was capped 89 times for Spain and scored 29 goals, being only surpassed by Raúl (who also took over his captain armband in June 2002, when he retired), David Silva, Fernando Torres and David Villa. He made his debut on 20 September 1989 – freshly signed by Madrid – in a 1–0 friendly victory over Poland in A Coruña, and appeared for the nation in the 1990 (although only as a squad member), 1994, 1998 and 2002 FIFA World Cups, as well as UEFA Euro 1996 (where he missed a penalty as Spain crashed out to hosts England in a shootout) and 2000.

One of Hierro's most important goals came during the 1994 World Cup qualification, as he headed the winner against Denmark that allowed ten-men Spain to qualify for the final tournament in the United States. In the finals, he scored after an individual effort against Switzerland in the round of 16, before his team was eliminated by Italy in the quarter-finals following a 2–1 loss.

Coaching career
Although he had already been in charge for a few weeks, Hierro was officially presented as sporting director of the Royal Spanish Football Federation in late September 2007. He remained four years in the position.

Hierro returned to his native region in July 2011, being appointed Málaga CF's director of football. On 28 May 2012, even though the club finished fourth and qualified for the Champions League for the first time ever, he left his position.

On 10 July 2014, Hierro was named assistant coach of Real Madrid, replacing Zinedine Zidane – who left to take the reins of Real Madrid Castilla – in Carlo Ancelotti's staff. He was given his first full managerial role two years later, being appointed at Segunda División side Real Oviedo for the upcoming season with the option of a further year; on 14 June 2017, after missing out on the promotion playoffs on the final matchday, he left the Estadio Carlos Tartiere by mutual consent.

Hierro returned to the Royal Spanish Football Federation as sporting director on 27 November 2017. He was appointed as the manager of Spain on 13 June 2018 after the sacking of Julen Lopetegui two days before their first match at the World Cup, following the latter's decision to join Real Madrid after the tournament. Two days later, he led the team to a 3–3 group stage draw against Portugal; on 8 July, following a penalty shootout loss to hosts Russia in the round of 16, he stepped down from his post and also announced that he would not return to his role as sporting director.

In 21 October 2022, Hierro was announced as sporting director of C.D. Guadalajara in the Mexican Liga MX.

Style of play
Equally at ease as a central defender, sweeper or defensive midfielder, Hierro had the ability, at his peak, to combine solid defensive play with a near-unlimited passing range and surprising goalscoring talent, which made him one of the world's most sought-after players. A large, physically imposing and intimidating defensive presence, he was also known for his positional sense, strength in the air, tenacity and the ability to time his challenges well.

Regarded as a highly competitive and hard-tackling defender, The Times placed Hierro at number 43 in their list of the 50 hardest footballers in history in 2007.

Personal life
Hierro's older brothers, Antonio and Manuel, were also professional footballers and defenders. The latter paired up with Fernando at Valladolid, as the club finished eighth in 1987–88.

Career statistics

Club

International

Scores and results list Spain's goal tally first, score column indicates score after each Hierro goal.

Notably, during the match against Austria on 4 September 1999, Hierro scored at both ends.

Managerial statistics

Honours
Real Madrid
La Liga: 1989–90, 1994–95, 1996–97, 2000–01, 2002–03
Copa del Rey: 1992–93
Supercopa de España: 1990, 1993, 1997, 2001
UEFA Champions League: 1997–98, 1999–2000, 2001–02
Intercontinental Cup: 1998, 2002
UEFA Super Cup: 2002
Copa Iberoamericana: 1994

Al-Rayyan
Emir of Qatar Cup: 2003–04

Individual
FIFA XI: 1996, 1997, 1998
UEFA Club Defender of the Year: 1997–98
ESM Team of the Year: 1996–97, 1997–98
FIFA World Cup All-Star Team: 2002

See also
List of La Liga players (400+ appearances)
List of Real Madrid CF records and statistics

References

External links

Real Madrid official profile

1968 births
Living people
People from Vélez-Málaga
Sportspeople from the Province of Málaga
Spanish footballers
Footballers from Andalusia
Association football defenders
Association football midfielders
Association football utility players
La Liga players
Real Valladolid Promesas players
Real Valladolid players
Real Madrid CF players
Premier League players
Bolton Wanderers F.C. players
Qatar Stars League players
Al-Rayyan SC players
UEFA Champions League winning players
Spain under-21 international footballers
Spain international footballers
1990 FIFA World Cup players
1994 FIFA World Cup players
UEFA Euro 1996 players
1998 FIFA World Cup players
UEFA Euro 2000 players
2002 FIFA World Cup players
Spanish expatriate footballers
Expatriate footballers in England
Expatriate footballers in Qatar
Spanish expatriate sportspeople in England
Spanish expatriate sportspeople in Qatar
Spanish football managers
Segunda División managers
Real Oviedo managers
Spain national football team managers
2018 FIFA World Cup managers
Real Madrid CF non-playing staff
Spanish expatriate sportspeople in Mexico